Max Huiberts (born 17 November 1970) is a Dutch former professional footballer who played as a striker.

References

External links
 Max Huiberts at VI 

Living people
1970 births
Sportspeople from Zwolle
Association football forwards
Dutch footballers
PEC Zwolle players
Roda JC Kerkrade players
Borussia Mönchengladbach players
AZ Alkmaar players
Directors of football clubs in the Netherlands
Bundesliga players
Eredivisie players
Eerste Divisie players
Footballers from Overijssel
Dutch expatriate footballers
Dutch expatriate sportspeople in Germany
Expatriate footballers in Germany